Sitala is a genus of air-breathing land snails, terrestrial pulmonate gastropod mollusks in the subfamily Durgellinae of the family Helicarionidae. 

Sitala is the type genus of the subfamily Sitalinae (which is a synonym of Durgellini.)

Species
Species within the genus Sitala include:
 
 Sitala acuta (Fischer-Piette & Salvat, 1966)
 Sitala acutecarinata Bavay & Dautzenberg, 1904
 Sitala ahitsitondronae Salvat, 1966
 Sitala aliceae Emberton & Pearce, 2000
 Sitala amabilis Fischer-Piette & Salvat, 1966
 Sitala ambovombeensis Fischer-Piette, Blanc, F. & Vukadinovic, 1974
 Sitala ampanasanensis Fischer-Piette, C. P. Blanc, F. Blanc & F. Salvat, 1994
 Sitala anakasakasensis Fischer-Piette, Blanc, F. & Vukadinovic, 1974
 Sitala ankazobei Fischer-Piette, C. P. Blanc, F. Blanc & F. Salvat, 1994
 Sitala antsingiana Fischer-Piette, Blanc, F. & Salvat, 1975
 Sitala arx (Benson, 1859)
 Sitala attegia (Benson, 1859)
 Sitala balliana Godwin-Austen, 1883
 Sitala bathiei (Fischer-Piette, Blanc, F. & Salvat, 1975)
 Sitala billeheusti (Crosse & P. Fischer, 1864)
 Sitala brancsiki O. Boettger, 1892
 Sitala burchi K. C. Emberton, Slapcinsky, C. A. Campbell, Rakotondrazafy, Andriamiarison & J. D. Emberton, 2010
 Sitala celebica P. Sarasin & F. Sarasin, 1899
 Sitala celestinae Emberton & Griffiths, 2009
 Sitala champfauri Fischer-Piette, C. P. Blanc, F. Blanc & F. Salvat, 1994
 Sitala circumfiliaris (Morelet, 1879)
 Sitala confinis (Möllendorff, 1901) (nomenclature: Sitala confinis (Blanford, 1865) and Sitala confinis (Möllendorff, 1901) are currently secondary homonyms but may end up in different genera and a replacement name may not be necessary) 
 Sitala confinis (W. T. Blanford, 1865)
 Sitala conradti Thiele, 1933
 Sitala crenicincta Godwin-Austen, 1883
 Sitala culmen (W. T. Blanford, 1865)
 Sitala culminis (Fischer-Piette & Salvat, 1966)
 Sitala decaryi Fischer-Piette, C. P. Blanc, F. Blanc & F. Salvat, 1994
 Sitala delaportei Fischer-Piette, Blanc, F. & Salvat, 1975
 Sitala delphini (Fischer-Piette, Blanc, F. & Vukadinovic, 1974)
 Sitala denselirata (Preston, 1908)
 Sitala elegans Emberton & Pearce, 2000
 Sitala elevata (Fischer-Piette & Salvat, 1966)
 Sitala euconuliforma Emberton & Pearce, 2000
 Sitala everetti Godwin-Austen, 1891
 Sitala filomarginata O. Boettger, 1892
 Sitala frenesti Fischer-Piette, C. P. Blanc, F. Blanc & F. Salvat, 1994
 Sitala gaudens Fischer-Piette & Salvat, 1966
 Sitala gaudialis Fischer-Piette, C. P. Blanc, F. Blanc & F. Salvat, 1994
 Sitala globulosa (Möllendorff, 1900)
 Sitala gratulator (W. T. Blanford, 1865)
 Sitala gromatica Godwin-Austen, 1882
 Sitala grommatica Godwin-Austen, 1882
 Sitala haroldi Godwin-Austen, 1882
 Sitala hestia (Dohrn, 1882)
 Sitala hirsuta Emberton & Griffiths, 2009
 Sitala ilapiryae Emberton & Pearce, 2000
 Sitala infula (Benson, 1848)
 Sitala injussa (W. T. Blanford & H. F. Blanford, 1861)
 Sitala insularis Möllendorff, 1894
 Sitala intonsa Godwin-Austen, 1883
 Sitala jenynsi (L. Pfeiffer, 1845)
 Sitala jeromi Fischer-Piette, C. P. Blanc, F. Blanc & F. Salvat, 1994
 Sitala josephinae Emberton & Pearce, 2000
 Sitala kendrae Emberton & Griffiths, 2009
 Sitala kuiperi Fischer-Piette, C. P. Blanc, F. Blanc & F. Salvat, 1994
 Sitala leroyi (Bourguignat, 1890)
 Sitala limata Godwin-Austen, 1882
 Sitala lincolni Emberton & Griffiths, 2009
 Sitala liricincta (Stolickzka, 1871)
 Sitala madecassina (Fischer-Piette & Salvat, 1966)
 Sitala mavo K. C. Emberton, Slapcinsky, C. A. Campbell, Rakotondrazafy, Andriamiarison & J. D. Emberton, 2010
 Sitala mazumbaiensis Verdcourt, 1977
 Sitala michellae Emberton & Griffiths, 2009
 Sitala minuta Emberton & Griffiths, 2009
 Sitala multivolvis Bavay & Dautzenberg, 1912
 Sitala nicklesi Fischer-Piette, C. P. Blanc, F. Blanc & F. Salvat, 1994
 Sitala normalis (Iredale, 1933)
 Sitala ochthogyra (Möllendorff, 1901)
 Sitala operiens Sykes, 1898
 Sitala palmaria (Benson, 1864)
 Sitala patwrightae Emberton, 1994
 Sitala pealii Godwin-Austen, 1914
 Sitala phulongensis Godwin-Austen, 1882
 Sitala phyllophila (Benson, 1863)
 Sitala placita Godwin-Austen, 1883
 Sitala pyramidalis Sykes, 1898
 Sitala recondita Godwin-Austen, 1883
 Sitala rimicola (Benson, 1859)
 Sitala roedereri Fischer-Piette, Blanc, F. & Salvat, 1975
 Sitala sculptilis (Möllendorff, 1901)
 Sitala soa Emberton & Pearce, 2000
 Sitala soulaiana Fischer-Piette, Cauquoin & Testud, 1973
 Sitala srimani Godwin-Austen, 1882
 Sitala stanisici K. C. Emberton, Slapcinsky, C. A. Campbell, Rakotondrazafy, Andriamiarison & J. D. Emberton, 2010
 Sitala steudneri (Jickeli, 1874)
 Sitala subangulata (Möllendorff, 1901)
 Sitala subinjussa Godwin-Austen, 1914
 Sitala sublirata Godwin-Austen, 1882
 Sitala subnana Godwin-Austen, 1883
 Sitala tredi Fischer-Piette, C. P. Blanc, F. Blanc & F. Salvat, 1994
 Sitala tricincta Saurin, 1953
 Sitala trochulus (Möllendorff, 1883)
 Sitala trosti Fischer-Piette, C. P. Blanc, F. Blanc & F. Salvat, 1994
 Sitala turrita Möllendorff, 1883
 Sitala uvida Godwin-Austen, 1883
 Sitala vaga Godwin-Austen, 1914
 Sitala vasihae Emberton & Pearce, 2000
 Sitala vulcania Blanford & Godwin-Austen, 1908
 Sitala zenkeri Thiele, 1931

Species brought into synonymy
 Sitala accepta E. A. Smith, 1895: synonym of Kaliella accepta (E. A. Smith, 1895)
 Sitala angulifera Pilsbry & Hirase, 1905: synonym of Sitalina angulifera (Pilsbry & Hirase, 1905) (original combination)
 Sitala anthropophagorum Hedley, 1894: synonym of Durgellina anthropophagorum (Hedley, 1894) (original combination)
 Sitala apicata (W. T. Blanford, 1870): synonym of Euplecta apicata (W. T. Blanford, 1870) (unaccepted combination)
 Sitala bandongensis O. Boettger, 1890: synonym of Kaliella microconus (Mousson, 1865)
 Sitala baritensis E. A. Smith, 1893: synonym of Kaliella microconus (Mousson, 1865)
 Sitala bicarinata van Benthem Jutting, 1929: synonym of Philalanka tjibodasensis (Leschke, 1914) (junior synonym)
 Sitala bicincta Bavay & Dautzenberg, 1912: synonym of Ruthvenia bicincta (Bavay & Dautzenberg, 1912) (original combination)
 Sitala bilirata (W. T. Blanford & H. F. Blanford, 1861): synonym of Philalanka bilirata (W. T. Blanford & H. F. Blanford, 1861) (unaccepted combination)
 Sitala busauensis E. A. Smith, 1895: synonym of Kaliella busauensis (E. A. Smith, 1895) (original combination)
 Sitala capillacea Soós, 1911: synonym of Durgellina capillacea (Soós, 1911) (original combination)
 Sitala cara E. A. Smith, 1895: synonym of Kaliella barrakporensis (L. Pfeiffer, 1852)
 Sitala carinifera Stoliczka, 1873: synonym of Philalanka carinifera (Stoliczka, 1873) (original combination)
 Sitala carinigera Tapparone Canefri, 1886: synonym of Philalanka carinigera (Tapparone Canefri, 1886) (original combination)
 Sitala circumcincta (Reinhardt, 1883): synonym of Sitalina circumcincta (Reinhardt, 1883) (unaccepted combination)
 Sitala collinae E. A. Smith, 1898: synonym of Durgellina collinae (E. A. Smith, 1898)
 Sitala concavispira F. Haas, 1936: synonym of Afroconulus concavispira (F. Haas, 1936) (original combination)
 Sitala crenocarinata Schepman, 1918: synonym of Durgellina crenocarinata (Schepman, 1918) (original combination)
 Sitala demissa E. A. Smith 1895: synonym of Kaliella calculosa (Gould, 1852)
 Sitala diaphana Connolly, 1922: synonym of Afroconulus diaphanus (Connolly, 1922) (original combination)
 Sitala ditropis Quadras & Möllendorff, 1894: synonym of Kaliella ditropis (Quadras & Möllendorff, 1894) (superseded combination)
 Sitala dulcis E. A. Smith, 1895: synonym of Kaliella scandens (Cox, 1871)
 Sitala elatior Bavay & Dautzenberg, 1908: synonym of Thysanota conula (Blanford, 1865)
 Sitala febrilis (W. T. Blanford & H. F. Blanford, 1861): synonym of Philalanka febrilis (W. T. Blanford & H. F. Blanford, 1861) (unaccepted combination)
 Sitala fimbriosa Quadras & Möllendorff, 1894: synonym of Thysanota conula (Blanford, 1865)
 Sitala fragilis Schepman, 1919: synonym of Durgellina fragilis (Schepman, 1919) (original combination)
 Sitala gradata Schepman, 1919: synonym of Durgellina gradata (Schepman, 1919) (original combination)
 Sitala gunongensis Godwin-Austen, 1909: synonym of Helicarion gunongensis (Godwin-Austen, 1909) (original combination)
 Sitala hainanensis Möllendorff, 1887: synonym of Sitalina hainanensis (Möllendorff, 1887) (original combination)
 Sitala hirasei Pilsbry, 1905: synonym of Sitalina hirasei (Pilsbry, 1905) (original combination)
 Sitala homfrayi Godwin-Austen, 1895: synonym of Philalanka homfrayi (Godwin-Austen, 1895) (original combination)
 Sitala inaequisculpta E. A. Smith, 1895: synonym of Philalanka moluensis (E. A. Smith, 1893)
 Sitala infantilis E. A. Smith, 1895: synonym of Kaliella infantilis (E. A. Smith, 1895) (original combination)
 Sitala insignis Pilsbry & Hirase, 1904: synonym of Sitalina insignis (Pilsbry & Hirase, 1904) (original combination)
 Sitala iredalei Preston, 1912: synonym of Afroconulus iredalei (Preston, 1912) (original combination)
 Sitala javana Möllendorff, 1897: synonym of Kaliella microconus (Mousson, 1865)
 Sitala latissima Pilsbry, 1902: synonym of Sitalina latissima (Pilsbry, 1902) (original combination)
 Sitala lineolata Möllendorff, 1891: synonym of Liardetia lineolata (Möllendorff, 1891) (superseded combination)
 Sitala lorentzi Schepman, 1919: synonym of Durgellina lorentzi (Schepman, 1919) (original combination)
 Sitala moluensis E. A. Smith, 1893: synonym of Philalanka moluensis (E. A. Smith, 1893)
 Sitala mononema (Benson, 1853): synonym of Philalanka mononema (Benson, 1853) (unaccepted combination)
 Sitala niijimana Pilsbry & Y. Hirase, 1903: synonym of Parasitala niijimana (Pilsbry & Y. Hirase, 1903) (original combination)
 Sitala normani (E. A. Smith, 1889): synonym of Lamprocystis normani (E. A. Smith, 1889) (superseded combination)
 Sitala orchis Godwin-Austen, 1891: synonym of Kaliella doliolum (L. Pfeiffer, 1846)
 Sitala oxyconus Möllendorff, 1894: synonym of Kaliella oxyconus (Möllendorff, 1894) (superseded combination)
 Sitala philippinarum Möllendorff, 1887: synonym of Liardetia philippinarum (Möllendorff, 1887) (original combination)
 Sitala propinqua Tapparone Canefri, 1886: synonym of Liardetia proqinqua (Tapparone Canefri, 1886) (original combination)
 Sitala pudica Gude, 1905: synonym of Liardetia scandens (Cox, 1872): synonym of Kaliella scandens (Cox, 1872) (junior synonym)
 Sitala quadricarinata Gude, 1917: synonym of Philalanka kusana (Aldrich, 1889)
 Sitala raricostulata E. A. Smith, 1893: synonym of Rahula raricostulata (E. A. Smith, 1893)
 Sitala rumbangensis E. A. Smith, 1895: synonym of Kaliella barrakporensis (L. Pfeiffer, 1852)
 Sitala singularis Godwin-Austen, 1891: synonym of Kaliella microconus (Mousson, 1865)
 Sitala striolata Möllendorff, 1901: synonym of Kaliella striolata (Möllendorff, 1901) (original combination)
 Sitala subbilirata Godwin-Austen, 1882: synonym of Philalanka subbilirata (Godwin-Austen, 1882) (original combination)
 Sitala subglobosa Soós, 1911: synonym of Durgellina subglobosa (Soós, 1911) (original combination)
 Sitala sublimis Hedley, 1897: synonym of Microcystina sublimis (Hedley, 1897) (original combination)
 Sitala sublineolata Möllendorff, 1902: synonym of Coneuplecta sublineolata (Möllendorff, 1902) (original combination)
 Sitala subscalaris Möllendorff, 1902: synonym of Queridomus subscalaris (Möllendorff, 1902) (original combination)
 Sitala tertiana (W. T. Blanford & H. F. Blanford, 1861): synonym of Philalanka tertiana (W. T. Blanford & H. F. Blanford, 1861)
 Sitala tjibodasensis Leschke, 1914: synonym of Philalanka tjibodasensis (Leschke, 1914) (original combination)
 Sitala tricarinata (W. T. Blanford & H. F. Blanford, 1861): synonym of Philalanka tricarinata (W. T. Blanford & H. F. Blanford, 1861) (unaccepted combination)
 Sitala tripilaris Gredler, 1890: synonym of Euplecta tripilaris (Gredler, 1890) (original combination)
 Sitala ultima Pilsbry & Hirase, 1909: synonym of Parasitala ultima (Hirase, 1908)
 Sitala urguessensis Connolly, 1925: synonym of Afroconulus urguessensis (Connolly, 1925) (original combination)
 Sitala vagata E. A. Smith, 1903: synonym of Kaliella vagata (E. A. Smith, 1903) (original combination)
 Sitala wilcoxi (Cox, 1865): synonym of Coneuplecta calculosa (A. Gould, 1852) (junior synonym)

References 

 Bank, R. A. (2017). Classification of the Recent terrestrial Gastropoda of the World. Last update: July 16th, 2017

External links
 Wallace, A. R. (1865). List of the land shells collected by Mr. Wallace in the Malay Archipelago, with descriptions of the new species by Mr. Henry Adams. Proceedings of the Zoological Society of London. 405-416, pl. 21
 Stoliczka, F. (1871). Notes on terrestrial Mollusca from the neighbourhood of Moulmein (Tenasserim Provinces), with descriptions of new species. The Journal of the Asiatic Society of Bengal, Part II, 40 (3): 217-259, pl. 15-19. Calcutta
 Mörch, O. A. L. (1872). Catalogue de Mollusques terrestres et fluviatiles des anciennes colonies danoises du golfe du Bengale. Journal de Conchyliologie. 20 (4): 303-327
 Iredale, T. (1933). Systematic notes on Australian land shells. Records of the Australian Museum. 19(1): 37-59.
 Godwin-Austen, H. H. (1882-1920). Land and freshwater Mollusca of India, including South Arabia, Baluchistan, Afghanistan, Kashmir, Nepal, Burmah, Pegu, Tenasserim, Malay Peninsula, Ceylon, and other islands of the Indian Ocean. Supplementary to Messrs. Theobald and Hanley's Conchologia Indica. London, Taylor & Francis.

Helicarionidae